Sebastián Mora-Mora (born April 14, 1998) is an American professional soccer player.

Career

Youth
In 2013, Mora-Mora was part of the academy at Mexican side UNAM, before going on to spend time with USSDA academy sides Nomads SC and Real Salt Lake AZ, eventually moving to Mexican side Tijuana. Here he played made 18 appearances for Tijuana Premier in the Liga Premier de México. Mora-Mora also spent a year in Argentina with Talleres de Remedios de Escalada.

Professional
On March 26, 2020, Mora-Mora returned to the United States, signing with USL Championship side Reno 1868. The club ceased operations following their 2020 season.

Mora-Mora joined USL League One side Chattanooga Red Wolves on January 13, 2021, ahead of their 2021 season. He made his debut for the club on May 8, 2021, keeping a clean-sheet during a 1–0 win over North Texas SC.

References

External links
 

1998 births
Living people
American soccer players
Expatriate footballers in Mexico
Association football goalkeepers
Reno 1868 FC players
Chattanooga Red Wolves SC players
Soccer players from Arizona
USL League One players
Talleres de Remedios de Escalada footballers